The Miss Brazil 2002 pageant took place 7 April 2002. Each state and the Federal District competed for their state and went to win the title of the Brazilian crown. The winner entered Miss Universe 2002. Miss Brazil Mundo would enter Miss World 2002. Miss Internacional Brazil would enter Miss International 2002. The winner was dethroned after coming back from Miss Universe due to being married at the time of the pageant. The first runner-up, Taíza Thomsen from Santa Catarina, was subsequently crowned Miss Brazil.

Results

Special Awards
Miss Internet - Tamara Ribeiro
Miss Congeniality - Aline Oliveira
Miss Photogenic - Cláudia Rohde
Best National Costume - Ádria da Silva

Delegates

 - Aline Oliveira Casas
 - Érika Catarina Tenório de Amorim
 - Jorlene Lima de Jesus Modesto
 - Tatiane Sofine Barbosa Alves
 - Bárbara Sinthia Fernandes Moreira
 - Andréa Batista Monteiro de Morais
 - Patrícia Wustro
 - Eliane Gil Gatto
 - Luana de Oliveira Chaves
 - Regiane Farah Botelho
 - Cláudia Renata Rohde Soare
 - Letícia de Souza Ávila
 - Tamara Raíssa Ribeiro de Faria
 - Mary Helen Corrêa de Oliveira Braga
 - Kilma Mônica Donato de Araújo
 - Keli Monik Kaniak Dulcinea
 - Milena Ricarda Lira de Lima
 - Roseane Lima de Oliveira
 - Giselle Patricia Leite Gusman
 - Muriel de Lima Mendes
 - Joseane Karina Oliveira Sousa
 - Renata Andresa Moya Medeiros
 - Ádria Mayara da Silva Rodrigues
 - Taíza Maria Thomsen Severina
 - Issa Johabel Alves de Oliveira
 - Ana Carla Dantas Ferreira
 - Daniela Marina Dias Fernandes

External links
 Official site (in Portuguese)

2002
2002 in Brazil
2002 beauty pageants